Christmas the Cowboy Way is a studio recording released by the Western band Riders in the Sky on October 5, 1999.  It is available as a single CD.

This is a collection new and old Christmas songs by Riders in the Sky.

Track listing
 Corn, Water and Wood
 Let It Snow/The Last Christmas Medley You'll Ever Need to Hear
 The Christmas Yodel
 Sidemeat's Christmas Stew
 The Prairie Dog Christmas Ball
 The Friendly Beasts
 Virgin Maria
 I'll Be Home for Christmas
 An Old Fashioned Christmas Polka
 The Twelve Days of Cowboy Christmas
 Just Put a Ribbon in Your Hair
 O Come, O Come, Emmanuel

Personnel
Douglas B. Green (a.k.a. Ranger Doug) – vocals, guitar
Paul Chrisman (a.k.a. Woody Paul) – vocals, fiddle
Fred LaBour (a.k.a. Too Slim) – vocals, bass
Joey Miskulin (a.k.a. Joey The Cowpolka King) – vocals, accordion

Additional personnel
Richard O'Brien, guitar
David Hungate, guitar
Bob Mater, drums, percussion
Jonathan Yudkin, violin
Jay Patten, tenor saxophone
Bob Warren, percussion

References

External links
Riders in the Sky Official Website

1999 Christmas albums
Christmas albums by American artists
Country Christmas albums
Riders in the Sky (band) albums
Rounder Records albums